Sweet Surrender is an American sitcom television series created by Deidre Fay and Stuart Wolpert, that aired for one season on NBC from  April 18, 1987 to July 8, 1987.

Cast
 Mark Blum as Ken Holden
 Dana Delany as Georgia Holden
 Viveka Davis as Cak
 David Doyle as Frank Macklin 
 Edan Gross as Bart Holden
 Marjorie Lord as Joyce Holden
 Louise Williams as Lyla Gafney

Episodes

References

External links
 

1987 American television series debuts
1987 American television series endings
1980s American sitcoms
English-language television shows
NBC original programming
Television series by Sony Pictures Television